Buckleys is a town in Saint John Parish, Antigua and Barbuda.

Demographics 
Buckleys has three enumeration districts.

 33600 Buckleys-West 
 33701 Buckleys-East_1
 33702 Buckleys-East_2

Census Data 
Source:

References 

Saint John Parish, Antigua and Barbuda
Populated places in Antigua and Barbuda